Ashley Stephenson (born November 22, 1982) is a former two-sport athlete from Ontario who played baseball for Canada women's national baseball team and ice hockey in the original NWHL and the CWHL. She won a silver medal at the 2015 Pan American Games.

Playing career

Hockey
Stephenson played her university hockey with the Wilfrid Laurier Golden Hawks women's ice hockey program from 2000 through 2005. Having won four Ontario University Athletics conference titles (2002, 2004–06), she was part of the Golden Hawks team that claimed the CIS National Championship in 2005.

In addition, she was recognized as the Most Valuable Player of the CIS National Championship tournament. Recognized as a CIS First-Team All-Canadian in 2006, she was inducted into the Golden Hawks Hall of Fame in 2011.

A member of the Brampton Thunder from 2005–07, she played for the Mississauga Chiefs from 2007-10. Among the highlights of her time with the Chiefs, she competed in the inaugural CWHL season (2007–08) and earned a gold medal at the 2008 Esso women's hockey nationals.

Claimed by the Thunder in the 2010 CWHL Draft, she would join the Burlington Barracudas. Competing with the Barracudas from 2010–12, she was part of their final season (2011–12). The final goal of her career stood as the game-winning goal in a December 18, 2011 match against the Toronto Furies, which would also prove to be the final win in Barracudas franchise history.

After suffering her seventh concussion, Stephenson was forced to retire from hockey. Heading into the 2012–13 CWHL season, she served as an assistant coach to Sommer West with the Toronto Furies.

Baseball
Stephenson and teammate Kate Psota have both participated with the Canadian national women's baseball team in every IBAF World Cup between 2004 and 2018. The team claimed six medals, four bronze (2004, 2006, 2012 and 2018) and two silver (2008 and 2016). At the 2008 Women's Baseball World Cup, she led all players with five stolen bases.

During the 2010 International Series in Cary, North Carolina, Ashley logged a .444 batting average as Canada prevailed in 4 out of 6 games against the United States. In 2011, she would be recognized for her contributions to the national team as the recipient of Baseball Canada's Jimmy Rattlesnake Award.

During 2015, she was one of three women (including teammate Autumn Mills that served as instructors at the Toronto Blue Jays Baseball Academy.

In 2019 she retired from international baseball as a player but continued as a coach.

Awards and honours

Hockey
 2002-03 OUA Women's Hockey Second Team All-Star
 2003-04 OUA Women's Hockey First Team All-Star
 2004-05 OUA Women's Hockey First Team All-Star
 2005-06 OUA Women's Hockey First Team All-Star
 2004-05 CIS Women's Hockey Championship Tournament MVP
 2004-05 CIS Women's Hockey Second Team All-Canadian
 2004-05 CIS Women's Hockey Championship Tournament All-Star
 2005-06 CIS Women's Hockey Championship Tournament All-Star
 CIS First-Team All-Canadian (2006)
 2005-06 Wilfrid Laurier Golden Hawks Team Most Valuable Player
 Golden Hawks Hall of Fame in 2011

Baseball
 Canadian National Women's Baseball Team MVP Award (2005, 2008)
 2008 IBAF World Cup Tournament All-Star (Third Base)
 2011 Baseball Canada Jimmy Rattlesnake Award

Personal
Stephenson graduated from Wilfrid Laurier University with an Honours Bachelor of Arts in Kinesiology. She would continue her education at Brock University, earning a Bachelor of Education. Currently, she is employed as a physical education teacher

References

External links
 
 

1982 births
Canadian female baseball players
Baseball people from Ontario
Brampton Thunder players
Burlington Barracudas players
Canadian women's ice hockey players
Ice hockey people from Ontario
Living people
Mississauga Chiefs players
Sportspeople from Mississauga
Wilfrid Laurier University alumni
Baseball players at the 2015 Pan American Games
Pan American Games silver medalists for Canada
Pan American Games medalists in baseball
Medalists at the 2015 Pan American Games